ISO 3166-2:LT is the entry for Lithuania in ISO 3166-2, part of the ISO 3166 standard published by the International Organization for Standardization (ISO), which defines codes for the names of the principal subdivisions (e.g., provinces or states) of all countries coded in ISO 3166-1.

Currently for Lithuania, ISO 3166-2 codes are defined for 10 counties, 7 city municipalities, 44 district municipalities and 9 municipalities.

Each code consists of two parts, separated by a hyphen. The second part is either of the following:
 two letters: counties
 two digits: city municipalities, district municipalities and municipalities

Current codes
Subdivision names are listed as in the ISO 3166-2 standard published by the ISO 3166 Maintenance Agency (ISO 3166/MA).

Counties
Click on the button in the header to sort each column.

 Notes

Municipalities
Click on the button in the header to sort each column.

Changes
The following changes have been announced by the ISO 3166/MA on the Online Browsing Platform (OBP):

See also
 Subdivisions of Lithuania
 FIPS region codes of Lithuania
 NUTS codes of Lithuania

External links
 ISO Online Browsing Platform: LT
 Counties of Lithuania, Statoids.com

2:LT
ISO 3166-2
Lithuania geography-related lists